Carryin' On with Johnny Cash & June Carter is an album by Johnny Cash and June Carter released in 1967 (see 1967 in music), on Columbia Records. The album consists exclusively of duets by Cash and Carter, including "Jackson"; "Long-Legged Guitar Pickin' Man" (written by Cash's bass player, Marshall Grant) was also released as a single. One track, a cover of Bob Dylan's "It Ain't Me, Babe", dated back to 1964 and had previously been released on Cash's 1965 album, Orange Blossom Special.

Cash and Carter married seven months after the album was released (with Carter subsequently changing her professional name to June Carter Cash), and the couple performed "Jackson" at numerous venues throughout the years. The album was re-issued on March 19, 2002, through Legacy Recordings, with two additional tracks.

Track listing
Adapted from Apple Music and Tidal:

Personnel
Credits adapted from Tidal:

 Johnny Cash - vocals, guitar
 June Carter - vocals
 Carl Perkins, Luther Perkins, Bob Johnson - guitar
 Norman Blake - guitar, dobro
 Marshall Grant - bass
 W.S. Holland - drums
 Charlie McCoy - harmonica
 Bill McElhiney, Karl Garvin - trumpet
 Phil Balsey, Jan Howard, The Carter Family - backing vocals

Charts
Album – Billboard (United States)

Singles - Billboard (United States)

References

Johnny Cash albums
June Carter Cash albums
1967 albums
Columbia Records albums
Vocal duet albums